The 11th Infantry Division is a formation of the Bangladesh Army based in Bogra Cantonment.

History 

In February 1996, President of Bangladesh Abdur Rahman Biswas dismissed the General officer commanding the 11th Infantry Division G.H. Murshed Khan for insubordination and Brigadier General Hameedur Rehman of Bangladesh Rifles. Chief of Staff of Bangladesh Army, Lieutenant General Abu Saleh Mohammed Nasim, revolted against the order leading to the 1996 Bangladeshi coup d'état attempt. Troops from the 11th Infantry Division tried to march to Dhaka but failed due to Savar Cantonment, which remained loyal to the president, blocking Jamuna River crossing.

The 11 Infantry Division organized a cultural program with ATN Bangla in February 2014.

Major General Md Khaled Al-Mamun was appointed commander of the 11th Infantry Division on 18 August 2022.

Former commanders 
 Major General Sadiqur Rahman Chowdhury
 Major General G.H. Murshed Khan
 Major General Muhammad Zia-Ur-Rahman
 Major General Md Saiful Alam
 Major General Md Moshfequr Rahman
 Major General A K M Nazmul Hasan

Units 
 11th Infantry Division HQ at Bogra Cantonment
 93rd Armoured Brigade
 26th Infantry Brigade
 111th Infantry Brigade
 11th Artillery Brigade (Jahangirabad Cantonment)
 24th Field Regiment Artillery
 10th Medium Regiment Artillery
 2nd Signal Battalion
 4th Signal Battalion

References 

Infantry divisions of Bangladesh